Colonel the Honorable Donald Ogilvy (27 May 1788 – 30 December 1863) of Clova in Forfarshire was a Scottish politician.

Ogilvy's father, who had inherited estates in both Forfarshire and Perthshire, styled himself the 5th Earl of Airlie. The title which had been attainted twice, through the family's involvement in both the Jacobite rising of 1715 and 1745 rising. The attainder was lifted in 1826, allowing Donald's other brother David to resume the title.

Ogilvy joined the army of East India Company in 1804, but was not promoted, so settled in Scotland first in Fettercairn, and then from 1820 at Clova. At the 1830 general election he contested the Perth Burghs, losing to John Stuart-Wortley. Wortley was unseated on petition, but the resulting by-election was contested by Ogilvy's brother William Ogilvy.

Donald was elected at a by-election in October 1831 as the Member of Parliament (MP) for Forfarshire, at a by-election following the sitting MP William Maule's elevation to the peerage. However, he was unseated on petition in January 1832, and did not stand for Parliament again.

In the 1830s he is listed as living at 4 Atholl Crescent in Edinburgh's West End.

References 
 

1788 births
1863 deaths
Members of the Parliament of the United Kingdom for Scottish constituencies
UK MPs 1831–1832
People from Angus, Scotland
British East India Company Army officers